Həbibkənd (also, Gabibkend and Gabib-Kend) is a village and municipality in the Khachmaz Rayon of Azerbaijan.  It has a population of 665.

References 

Populated places in Khachmaz District